Mika Horiuchi (born April 22, 1986) is an American musician. He is the bassist for the bands Cellador, Falling in Reverse, Rob the Cartel, and NOISE.

Early life 
Horiuchi was born on April 22, 1986, in Seattle, Washington. At nine years old, he learned to play guitar. He also started playing trumpet and took part in classical music and jazz bands. As a teenager, Horiuchi learned to play bass, forming his first band in 2001, at age 16.

Music career

Cellador (2007–2009) 

Horiuchi joined the band Cellador in early 2007. He left the band in mid-2009 and was replaced by James Pickett in 2011.

Starstruck for Stereo (2010–2012) 
Horiuchi started an acoustic, pop, alternative rock, indie rock, and experimental rock solo career, known as "Starstruck for Stereo". Horiuchi released a demo on his MySpace page on January 22, 2011  called LOVE-U. In this project, Horiuchi sings and plays guitar, bass guitar, percussion, piano and more. Horiuchi had released a few songs for SFS throughout 2010 and 2011; when questioned by fans through his Facebook page about whether he would continue with the project, he responded, "...starstruck for stereo is just a time killer..."

On November 13, Horiuchi posted lyrics for an upcoming Starstruck for Stereo song, indicating that he was continuing with SFS.

Falling in Reverse (2011–2012) 
In place of the founder and bass guitarist, Nason Schoeffler, Horiuchi joined the band Falling in Reverse. Nason left the band due to a desire to prioritize his project Me Myself Alive, in which he was a bass guitarist. Shortly afterwards the band released its debut album, The Drug in Me Is You, on July 26. Horiuchi is listed as a bass guitarist in the credits, but did not compose or participate in the studio; however, he did participate in video clips and appear in the music videos. The band went on tour, and confirmed its integration into the Warped Tour annually. In January 2012, the band announced Mika Horiuchi's departure.

Rob the Cartel (2012) 
During late 2012, Ahmad Alkurabi's (A Smile from the Trenches member) was searching for a new bassist for his band Rob the Cartel. A few days later, the band announced via its Facebook page that Horiuchi was in the band. Currently the band is touring and have plans to release a new EP. On October 22, Ahmad announced that Rob the Cartel had disbanded due to Stason, Andrew, Mika, and Tommy leaving to form the band NOISE.

NOISE (2012–2013) 
On October 22, RTC had split, leaving all the members but Ahmad to form a band called NOISE. The band announced its plans to release a debut album and its first single soon afterward. The band released a studio teaser for its song "My Sanity" on November 27. The band released a second single called "One You Plus Three Who's Your Lover", on January 25, 2013. The band stated its plans to reside in New York.

Deadbeat Diary (2013) 
As of mid-2013, NOISE was supposedly disbanded when all the websites for the band were deleted, including the Facebook page.

Horiuchi later joined the band Deadbeat Diary alongside Joel Faviere (formerly of Get Scared) and Stephen Krypel. They released 2 singles in 2013 titled "Born To Hate You" and "Hell To Pay", the latter of which was produced by Faviere. The band later disbanded, and "Born To Hate You" ended up being the last song on Joel Faviere's latest release Dark Days.

Other ventures
In 2008, Horiuchi released his own clothing line titled Aizou Clothing.

References

External links 
 Official MySpace page

1986 births
Living people
Musicians from Seattle
American musicians of Japanese descent
American rock musicians
21st-century American bass guitarists
Falling in Reverse members